Anil Nayar is a former squash player originally from India. He was the first Indian player to win the Drysdale Cup tournament in London 1965 (then the de facto junior world championship event). He was also a men’s national champion twice in the U.S., in 1969 and 1970, twice in Canada, once in Mexico and eight times in India.

Early life 
Nayar learned to play squash at the Cricket Club of India under the tutelage of coach Yusuf Khan, who later emigrated to the U.S. and served as coach and mentored many other champion players.  He would graduate from Harvard University in 1969.

Career 
After Nayar won the U.S. men’s crown in 1970, the writer Roy Blount Jr. described the Indian’s style of play in a piece he wrote about the match in Sports Illustrated magazine: "Nayar plays Pakistani-Indian style, scrambling helter-skelter all over the court, slapping low-skimming bullets with a racquet held nearly halfway up the handle, returning impossible shots with even less possible shots and, above all, going like crazy all the time." Nayar is widely regarded by fellow Indians who follow the sport as India’s greatest player.

Awards and recognition 
William J. Bingham Award, Harvard University - 1969
Arjuna Award - 1969
U.S. Squash Hall of Fame Inductee

References

Indian male squash players
Indian emigrants to the United States
Year of birth missing (living people)
Living people
Harvard Crimson men's squash players
Recipients of the Arjuna Award